Sumra Kera is a village in the Bhiwani district of the Indian state of Haryana. , the village had 165 households with a population of 1176 and 875 voters of which 474 were male and 401 female.

References

Villages in Bhiwani district